1982 Emmy Awards may refer to:

 34th Primetime Emmy Awards, the 1982 Emmy Awards ceremony honoring primetime programming
 9th Daytime Emmy Awards, the 1982 Emmy Awards ceremony honoring daytime programming
 10th International Emmy Awards, the 1982 Emmy Awards ceremony honoring international programming

Emmy Award ceremonies by year